This article is a list of diseases of bleeding hearts (Clerodendrum thomsoniae).

Fungal diseases

Nematodes, parasitic

Viral and viroid diseases

References
Common Names of Diseases, The American Phytopathological Society

Clerodendrum
Bleeding heart